}
The 1892 California Golden Bears football team was an American football team that represented the University of California, Berkeley during the 1892 college football season. The team competed as an independent and compiled a record of 2–1–1 under first-year head coach Lee McClung.

Schedule

References

California
California Golden Bears football seasons
California Golden Bears football